This is a list of members of the Queensland Legislative Council from 1 January 1870 to 31 December 1879. Appointments, made by the Governor of Queensland, were for life, although many members for one reason or another resigned.

It was expanded from 21 to 30 members during the period, with 6 members being added on 2 January 1874, and another three on 12 May 1877.

Office bearers

President of the Legislative Council:
 Maurice Charles O'Connell (26 August 1860 – 23 March 1879)
 Joshua Peter Bell (3 April 1879 – 20 December 1881)

Chairman of Committees:
 Daniel Foley Roberts (30 May 1860 – 26 July 1889)

Members

References

 Waterson, Duncan Bruce: Biographical Register of the Queensland Parliament 1860-1929 (second edition), Sydney 2001.
 Alphabetical Register of Members (Queensland Parliament)

Members of Queensland parliaments by term
19th-century Australian politicians